Praomys is a genus of rodent in the family Muridae endemic to Sub-Saharan Africa. It contains the following species:
 Praomys coetzeei
 Dalton's mouse, Praomys daltoni
 De Graaff's soft-furred mouse, Praomys degraaffi
 Deroo's mouse, Praomys derooi
 Hartwig's soft-furred mouse, Praomys hartwigi
 Jackson's soft-furred mouse, Praomys jacksoni
 Least soft-furred mouse, Praomys minor
 Misonne's soft-furred mouse, Praomys misonnei
 Cameroon soft-furred mouse, Praomys morio
 Muton's soft-furred mouse, Praomys mutoni
 Gotel Mountain soft-furred mouse, Praomys obscurus
 Petter's soft-furred mouse, Praomys petteri
 Forest soft-furred mouse, Praomys rostratus
 Tullberg's soft-furred mouse, Praomys tullbergi

References

 
Rodent genera
 
Taxa named by Oldfield Thomas
Taxonomy articles created by Polbot